Streptomyces andamanensis is a bacterium species from the genus Streptomyces which has been isolated from  soil from the Similan Islands in Thailand.

See also 
 List of Streptomyces species

References

External links
Type strain of Streptomyces andamanensis at BacDive -  the Bacterial Diversity Metadatabase

 

andamanensis
Bacteria described in 2016